The  singles competition of the 2005 Hastings Direct International Championships was part of the 31st edition of the Eastbourne International tennis tournament, Tier II of the 2005 WTA Tour. Svetlana Kuznetsova was the defending champion but lost in the semifinals to Kim Clijsters. Clijsters won in the final 7–5, 6–0 against Vera Douchevina.

Seeds
A champion seed is indicated in bold text while text in italics indicates the round in which that seed was eliminated. The top four seeds received a bye to the second round.

Draw

Final

Top half

Bottom half

External links
 2005 Hastings Direct International Championships Draw

Singles
Hastings Direct International Championships